Dennis Eric Jan Van Vaerenbergh (born 26 June 1998) is a Belgian footballer who plays for amateur club SC Dikkelvenne.

Club career
He made his Eerste Divisie debut for FC Eindhoven on 15 September 2017 in a game against RKC Waalwijk.

International career
He played for Belgium national under-17 team at the 2015 UEFA European Under-17 Championship and 2015 FIFA U-17 World Cup.

References

External links
 

1998 births
Living people
People from Asse
Footballers from Flemish Brabant
Belgian footballers
Association football forwards
FC Eindhoven players
Club Brugge KV players
F.C.V. Dender E.H. players
Eerste Divisie players
Belgian Third Division players
Belgium youth international footballers
Belgian expatriate footballers
Expatriate footballers in the Netherlands
Belgian expatriate sportspeople in the Netherlands